United States v. Cecil Price, et al., also known as the Mississippi Burning trial or Mississippi Burning case, was a criminal trial where the United States charged a group of 18 men with conspiring in a Ku Klux Klan plot to murder three young civil rights workers – Michael Schwerner, James Chaney, and Andrew Goodman – in Philadelphia, Mississippi on June 21, 1964 during Freedom Summer. The trial, conducted in Meridian, Mississippi with U.S. District Court Judge W. Harold Cox presiding, resulted in convictions of 7 of the 18 defendants.

Initial proceedings

Indictments were originally presented against 18 defendants, three of whom were officials of the Mississippi government, for conspiracy to commit as well as substantial violations of deprivation of rights secured or protected by the Constitution. The District Court initially dismissed the indictments, but the dismissal was unanimously reversed by the Supreme Court upon appeal. The trial then proceeded.

Verdict

Guilty verdicts were returned against:

 Cecil Price, the chief deputy sheriff of Neshoba County, Mississippi
 Sam H. Bowers, Jr., of Laurel, the Imperial Wizard of the White Knights of the Ku Klux Klan
 Horace Doyle Barnette, a one-time Meridian salesman
 Jimmy Arledge, a Meridian truck driver
 Billy Wayne Posey, a Williamsville service station operator
 Jimmy Snowden, a Meridian laundry truck driver
 Alton W. Roberts, a Meridian salesman who shot two of the three civil rights workers

Not guilty verdicts were returned for:

 Lawrence A. Rainey, the sheriff of Neshoba County
 Bernard L. Akin, a Meridian housetrailer dealer
 Travis M. Barnette, a Meridian mechanic and half-brother of Horace Doyle Barnette
 James T. Harris, a Meridian truck driver
 Frank J. Herndon, the operator of a Meridian drive-in restaurant
 Olen Lovell Burrage, the owner of the farm on which the bodies of Schwerner, Chaney, and Goodman were buried
 Herman Tucker, the builder of the dam in which the bodies were found
 Richard A. Willis, a one-time Philadelphia policeman

No verdict was reached for:

 Ethel Glen Barnett, the Democratic nominee for Neshoba County sheriff
 Jerry McGrew Sharpe, a pulpwood hauler
 Edgar Ray Killen, a fundamentalist minister and sawmill operator. In the case of Killen, the jury deadlocked after a lone juror stated she "could never convict a preacher". The case against Killen was reopened in 1999, and on June 21, 2005 he was found guilty of three counts of manslaughter for orchestrating the killings.

Jury

An all-white, mostly working-class jury consisting of five men and seven women heard the case. The jurors were:

 Langdon Smith Anderson (foreman), a Lumberton oil exploration operator and member of the State Agricultural and Industrial Board
 Mrs. S.M. Green, a Hattiesburg housewife
 Mrs. Lessie Lowery, a Hiwannee grocery store owner
 Howard O. Winborn, a Petal pipefitter
 Harmon W. Raspberry, a Stonewall textile worker
 Mrs. Gussie B. Staton, a Union housewife
 Jessie P. Hollingsworth, a Moss Point electrician
 Mrs. James C. Heflin, a Lake production worker
 Mrs. Nell B. Dedeaux, a Lumberton housewife
 Willie V. Arneson, a Meridian secretary
 Edsell Z. Parks, a Brandon clerk
 Adelaide H. Comer, a cook at an Ocean Springs school cafeteria

Penalties
The penalties exacted by the federal penal system were,
 for Price: sentenced to six years in prison, and served four years
 for Bowers: sentenced to ten years in prison, and served six years
 for Barnette: sentenced to three years in prison
 for Arledge: sentenced to three years in prison
 for Posey: sentenced to six years in prison
 for Snowden: sentenced to three years in prison, and served two years
 for Roberts: sentenced to ten years in prison, and served six years

Film adaptation

In 1988, the film Mississippi Burning was loosely based on the trial and the events surrounding the murder. It starred Gene Hackman and Willem Dafoe as two FBI agents who travel to Mississippi to uncover the events surrounding the disappearance of three civil rights workers.

Several of the fictitious characters in the movie were based on real-life defendants in the trial. Deputy Sheriff Clinton Pell (played by Brad Dourif) was based on Cecil Ray Price, Sheriff Ray Stuckey (played by Gailard Sartain) was based on Sheriff Lawrence Rainey, and Frank Bailey (played by Michael Rooker) was based on Alton W. Roberts. The film also starred R. Lee Ermey and Frances McDormand.

See also
 Civil Rights Movement
 List of United States Supreme Court cases, volume 383
 United States v. Shipp, 1906 federal criminal case

Further reading

References

External links

 U. S. vs Cecil Price et al.. ("Mississippi Burning" Trial)

1964 crimes in the United States
1966 in Mississippi
1966 in United States case law
Civil rights movement case law
Ku Klux Klan crimes in Mississippi
Legal history of Mississippi
United States Supreme Court cases
United States Supreme Court cases of the Warren Court
United States racial discrimination case law